The International Tchaikovsky Competition is a classical music competition held every four years in Moscow and Saint Petersburg, Russia, for pianists, violinists, and cellists between 16 and 32 years of age and singers between 19 and 32 years of age. The competition is named after Russian composer Pyotr Ilyich Tchaikovsky. It was a member of the World Federation of International Music Competitions until April 2022, when it was excluded due to the 2022 Russian invasion of Ukraine.

The International Tchaikovsky Competition was the first international music competition held in the Soviet Union. For the XIV competition in 2011, Valery Gergiev was appointed the competition's chairman, and Richard Rodzinski, former president of the Van Cliburn Foundation, was appointed general director. A new voting system was instituted, created by mathematician John MacBain, and used by the International Violin Competition of Indianapolis, the Van Cliburn International Piano Competition, and the Cleveland International Piano Competition. All rules and regulations also underwent a complete revision. Emphasis was placed on the composition of the jury, which consisted primarily of well-known and respected performing artists.

The XIV International Tchaikovsky Competition was held in Moscow and St. Petersburg, Russia, from 14 June to 1 July 2011, under the auspices of the Russian federal government and its Ministry of Culture. The competition disciplines were piano, violin, cello, and voice (male singers and female singers). The XV competition took place in June 2015. The XVI competition took place 17–29 June 2019, in Moscow and St. Petersburg; woodwind and brass competition disciplines were added.

Prizes
Cash prizes are awarded to the top-five competitors in each discipline of piano, violin, cello, and to each of the top four competitors in the men's and women's solo vocal categories.  First prize (not always awarded) is US$30,000; second, US$20,000; third, US$10,000; fourth, US$5,000; and fifth, US$3,000. An additional prize, a Grand Prix of US$100,000, may be awarded to one of the gold medalists deemed outstanding by the juries. Additional awards are given for best performance of the chamber concertos and the commissioned new work.

For the 2019 competition, the prizes are as follows:

History
Held every four years, the first competition, in 1958, included two disciplines: piano and violin. Beginning with the second competition, in 1962, a cello category was added, and the vocal division was introduced during the third competition in 1966. In 1990, a fifth discipline was announced for the IX International Tchaikovsky Competition: a contest for violin makers, which traditionally comes before the main competition. In 2019, two new categories were added to the competition, woodwinds and brass.

Tianxu An incident
On 25 June 2019, at the final round of the piano category, Chinese competitor Tianxu An was supposed to play Tchaikovsky's Piano Concerto No. 1 followed by Rachmaninoff's Rhapsody on a Theme of Paganini. However, the scores on the orchestra's and conductor's stands were placed in reversed order and the Rachmaninoff piece was announced first, different from what the pianist requested. Since An didn't understand Russian, he was unaware of the situation. With the piano entry in the Rachmaninoff almost immediate, the performance "began with a failure". Following the incident, jury chair Denis Matsuev invited him to perform the program again, but An declined. The competition made an official apology and the orchestra administration suspended the responsible staff after the event. An was eventually awarded a "special prize" for his confidence and courage.

Excluded from World Federation of International Music Competitions (WFIMC) 
On 19 April 2022, World Federation of International Music Competitions (WFIMC) decided with an overwhelming majority of member votes to exclude the International Tchaikovsky Competition from its membership with immediate effect due to "Russia´s brutal war and humanitarian atrocities in Ukraine".

Prize winners 
Winners of the prizes and medals awarded in the given year and category.

Piano

Violin

Cello

Vocal, female

Vocal, male

Woodwinds

Brass

Grand Prix

See also 

 International Tchaikovsky Competition for Young Musicians
 List of classical music competitions
 World Federation of International Music Competitions
 Critics' Prize (Tchaikovsky Competition)

References

External links 
 
 

 
Quadrennial events
Recurring events established in 1958
1958 establishments in Russia